Los Osos High School is a public high school located in the city of Rancho Cucamonga in Southern California's Inland Empire in the United States. It operates as part of the Chaffey Joint Union High School District. The school was named a California Distinguished School in 2013, was the recipient of a Golden Ribbon Award from the California Department of Education in 2017, and was a 2018 U.S. News & World Report Best High School Silver Medalist. Graduates from the Class of 2017 met the University of California A-G admission requirements at a rate of 66.4%, nearly 20% higher than the state average.

Notable alumni

Kevin Holland, UFC fighter
Victor Bolden Jr., San Francisco 49ers wide receiver
Richard Brehaut, UCLA quarterback
Nichkhun Buck Horvejkul,  entertainer, actor, model, and member of the popular South Korean boy band 2PM.
Ifeoma Onumonu, NJ/NY Gotham FC soccer player
Addison Reed, Major League Baseball (MLB) pitcher
Travis Tartamella, MLB catcher
Kendall Williams, University of New Mexico starting point guard
Tony Washington, Houston Texans linebacker

Notes and references

External links

High School Home Page

High schools in San Bernardino County, California
Education in Rancho Cucamonga, California
Educational institutions established in 2002
Public high schools in California
2002 establishments in California